Dashamir Tahiri is member of the Parliament of Albania representing the Party for Justice, Integration and Unity (PDIU).

Tahiri's father was a nephew of the Albanian patriot Veli Gërra.

On 10 December 2012, Tahiri and Shpëtim Idrizi presented to Parliament a resolution in which the PDIU asked Greece for  reparations in the amount of 10 billion euros for the expulsion of Cham Albanians.

See also
Politics of Albania

References

Members of the Parliament of Albania
Party for Justice, Integration and Unity politicians
Living people
21st-century Albanian politicians
Year of birth missing (living people)